James Lawrence Boyd  (18 August 1891 – 15 June 1930) was a Scottish first-class cricketer, rugby union international and Royal Navy officer.

The son of Thomas Morgan Boyd, a Scottish tea merchant, Boyd was born in China at Amoy. He was educated in England at the Royal Naval College, Osborne from where he entered into the Royal Navy as a sub-lieutenant. Boyd was selected to play rugby union for Scotland as a fly-half in 1912, making two Test appearances against England in the Five Nations Championship in March, and South Africa in November, with both matches played at Inverleith. The following year he was promoted to the rank of lieutenant, in addition to making a single appearance in first-class cricket for the Royal Navy against the British Army cricket team at Lord's. Boyd served with the navy in the First World War, during which he was awarded the Distinguished Service Cross in October 1916 in recognition of his service aboard submarines. Following the war, he made a further first-class appearance for the Royal Navy against the Army at Lord's in 1919. He was promoted to the rank of lieutenant commander in April 1921, with promotion to the rank of commander following in June 1926. He was placed on the retired list in February 1930, on account of ill health. Boyd died shortly after in June 1930 at Arosa in Switzerland.

References

External links

1891 births
1930 deaths
People from Xiamen
People educated at the Royal Naval College, Osborne
Royal Navy officers
Scottish rugby union players
Scotland international rugby union players
Scottish cricketers
Royal Navy cricketers
Royal Navy personnel of World War I
Recipients of the Distinguished Service Cross (United Kingdom)
Royal Navy submarine commanders
British expatriates in China